Les Evans (22 January 1909 – 22 December 1975) was an Australian rules footballer who played with St Kilda in the Victorian Football League (VFL).

Notes

External links 

1909 births
1975 deaths
Australian rules footballers from Victoria (Australia)
St Kilda Football Club players
Port Fairy Football Club players
Kew Football Club players